The  is a pair of Kofun period tumuli, located in the Shinonoi-ishikawa neighborhood of the city of Nagano in the Chubu region Japan. They have has been protected under a single National Historic Site designation since 1977.

Overview
It is located on the western slope of Mount Shimomoi at the western edge of the Nagano Basin, with the ruins of a small settlement and rice fields at its base. The size of the mound is 93 meters in length, with a  45-meter diameter posterior circular portion, ten meters in height and a 26 meter long anterior rectangular portion, five meters in height, and is orientated north-northeast. It was once covered with fukiishi and cylindrical haniwa and had an encircling moat, small traces of which still exist. The tumulus had two vertical burial chambers arranged parallel to the main axis, one on each portion of the mound. Both chambers were lined with split andesite stone blocks, and were painted in vermillion. The chamber in the posterior domed-portion was 10.3 meters in length by 1.8 meters wide. The anterior chamber was 2.7 meters long by 1.2 meters wide. 

The tomb was robbed by local farmers in 1800, who found that it contained a large number of grave goods, including 42 bronze mirrors, wheel-like stones, copper tubes, jewelry and beads, magatama, and fragments of armor.  The site was re-excavated in 1927. The number of bronze mirrors from this tumulus was extraordinarily large, but the whereabouts of only six are known today. Of these six, one had been determined to have been of Western Han provenience, and the others were made in Japan.   

The style of the haniwa recovered at the site is very similar to that of the Mori-Shōgunzuka Kofun, leading archaeologists to concur that this tomb was built  from the end of the 4th century to the first half of the 5th century. As with the Mori-Shōgunzuka Kofun, it is regarded as a tomb of the local king with close relations to the Yamato dynasty.

The Himezuka Kofun is a "two conjoined rectangles" typed , and is located 200 meter north of the Senryū-Shōgunzuka Kofun on the same ridge.  Its total length is 31 meters. The rear portion is 20 meters high with a height of four meters and the front portion has  height of two meters. It has not been excavated, but from its style is thought to date to around the middle of the 4th century, and to thus pre-date the Senryū-Shōgunzuka Kofun.

The site is approximately ten minutes by car from Shinonoi Station on the JR West Shin'etsu Main Line; however, there are no public facilities and the tombs are located in an area wth dense forests.

See also
List of Historic Sites of Japan (Nagano)

References

External links
Nagano city cultural database 
Nagao Prefecture Tourist Information 

Nagano (city)
Kofun
Archaeological sites in Japan
History of Nagano Prefecture
Historic Sites of Japan